Bloxholm is a hamlet, and part of the civil parish of Ashby de la Launde and Bloxholm, in the North Kesteven district of Lincolnshire, England.

Bloxholm Hall
Bloxholm Hall is a partially demolished early 18th-century country house of which the surviving north wing now serves as a Grade II listed farmhouse.

It was built in 1707 for Septimus Cyprian Thornton and was acquired by the Duchess of Rutland, from whom it descended to General Lord Robert Manners (1721–1782). It was enlarged in 1772 by the addition of a north wing by architect Lewis Vulliamy. It passed to his son George Manners (1763–1828), High Sheriff of Lincolnshire for 1826, who further enlarged and renovated the hall to the designs of Vulliamy, adding a stable block (now also Grade II listed). He died unmarried, leaving the estate to his great-niece Mary, who married Robert Dundas, later Robert Nisbet-Hamilton, MP and Privy Counsellor. He died in 1887 leaving an only daughter Mary Georgiana, who predeceased him, having married Henry Olgilvy. The Olgilvys had lived at one of their several Scottish homes and Bloxholm was sold.

The hall was abandoned in the 1940s and the older main wing demolished in 1963. The north wing is now a farmhouse.

References

External links

Villages in Lincolnshire
North Kesteven District